Khar Lake (lit. "black lake"is located in the Khovd aimag (province) in western Mongolia's Great Lakes Depression.

Name 
It is also known as Ha-la Hu, Hara Nuur, Har Nuur, Khara Nur, Khar Nuur, and Ozero Kara-Nor

It should be distinguished from the similarly named Khar Lake (Zavkhan), another lake further east in Mongolia.

Description 
It is part of a group of lakes that were once part of a larger prehistoric lake that disappeared 5,000 years ago as the region became drier.

Some sources are using different Khar Lake statistics values:
Water level: 1,134.08 m
Surface area: 565.2 km²
Average depth: 4.14 m
Volume: 2.34 km³.

Water Balance 

Khar Lake has a single inflow - Chono Kharaikh Gol river, which creates a river delta.

Khar Lake has a connection to Dörgön Nuur south of it.

References

External links
Limnological Catalog of Mongolian Lakes

Lakes of Mongolia